ISO 15118 Road vehicles -- Vehicle to grid communication interface is a proposed international standard defining a vehicle to grid (V2G) communication interface for bi-directional charging/discharging of electric vehicles. The standard provides multiple use cases like secure communication, smart charging and the Plug & Charge feature used by some electric vehicle networks.

Overview 
ISO 15118 is one of the International Electrotechnical Commission's (IEC) group of standards for electric road vehicles and electric industrial trucks, and is the responsibility of Joint Working Group 1 (JWG1 V2G) of IEC Technical Committee 69 (TC69) together with subcommittee 31 (SC31) of the International Organization for Standardization's (ISO) Technical Committee 22 (TC22) on road vehicles. 

ISO and IEC began working together on the standard in 2010, and a Plug & Charge section was released in 2014. No automakers had a productive implementation of the standard by 2018.

V2G-PKI 
ISO 15118 communication can be secured by a TLS connection between EV and electric vehicle supply equipment (EVSE). For the use case Plug&Charge this is even mandatory. The norm describes how a needed "V2G-PKI" (vehicle to grid - Public Key Infrastructure) needs to be set up. Hubject provided already in 2018 the first productive V2G-PKI an the related ecosystem for EU and US. The only productive certificate authority for a V2G-PKI is currently operated by Hubject. Several other companies declared work on a V2G-PKI solutions among which CharIn and Gireve. Nevertheless charge station operators and automakers can also handle the certificates if they are based on the ISO15118 standard.

 and 2020, several Public Key Infrastructure issues remained unsolved for using the standard as proposed.

Plug & Charge 

The user-convenient and secure Plug & Charge feature that envisioned with ISO 15118 enables an electric vehicle to automatically identify and authorize itself to a compatible charging station on behalf of the driver, to receive energy for recharging its battery. The only action required by the driver is to plug the charging cable into the EV and/or charging station. The car and the charger identify themselves to each other by exchanging certificates which were provided beforehand via a certificate pool to facilitate payment. An open test system was started in November 2021. The proposed standard can be used for both wired (AC and DC charging) and wireless charging for electric vehicles.

Some EV cars support the Plug & Charge standard, including the model year 2021 Porsche Taycan, Mercedes-Benz EQS, Lucid Air, Ford Mustang Mach-E, and the Rivian R1T.

Other electric vehicles could possibly be updated to support the standard, including the Volkswagen ID.4. Some cars need hardware updates.

All Tesla vehicles since 2012 (before the release of ISO 15118-2 in 2014) have a proprietary version of plug & charge. Other proprietary solutions exist, such as those developed by Paua. 

Besides Tesla, alternatives to Plug & Charge exist including "AutoCharge" based on DIN Spec 70121 (Combined Charging System - CCS) using the car's fixed MAC address which is not a secure mechanism, however companies like the Volkswagen Group cars do not have a fixed MAC address and cannot use AutoCharge.

Standard documents 
ISO 15118 consists of the following parts, detailed in separate standard documents:
 ISO 15118-1: General information and use-case definition
 ISO 15118-2: Network and application protocol requirements
 ISO 15118-3: Physical and data link layer requirements
 ISO 15118-4: Network and application protocol conformance test
 ISO 15118-5: Physical and data link layer conformance test
 ISO/DIS 15118-6: General information and use-case definition for wireless communication (out of commission, merged with 2nd edition of ISO 15118-1)
 ISO/CD 15118-7: Network and application protocol requirements for wireless communication (out of commission, moved to ISO/DIS 15118–20)
 ISO 15118-8: Physical layer and data link layer requirements for wireless communication
ISO 15118-20: 2nd generation network and application protocol requirements

Use of ISO 15118 in heavy duty vehicles 
The ISO 15118 is also used as communication protocol for charging of heavy duty vehicles as:
 Harbor Automated Guided Vehicles 
 Public transportation 

When using the ISO 15118 in a commercial operation the use of WLAN (ISO 15118-8) must be considered carefully since there is no way to guarantee operation uptime when using wireless communication based on WLAN. For these situations the same protocol as for passenger car charging can be used (ISO 15118-3 powerline communication).

References

See also 
 Combined Charging System (CCS)
 IEC 63110

15118